Kang Lee-seul (강이슬, Kang Iseul, born 5 April 1994) is a South Korean basketball player for Cheongju KB Stars and the South Korean national team.

She participated at the 2018 FIBA Women's Basketball World Cup.

References

External links

1994 births
Living people
Forwards (basketball)
People from Sacheon
South Korean women's basketball players
Basketball players at the 2018 Asian Games
Asian Games silver medalists for Korea
Asian Games medalists in basketball
Medalists at the 2018 Asian Games
Basketball players at the 2020 Summer Olympics
Olympic basketball players of South Korea
Sportspeople from South Gyeongsang Province